Balmain Tigers Football Club was an Australian semi-professional football club based in the Inner West suburb of Balmain in Sydney, New South Wales. The club played at the historic Birchgrove Oval, just west of Balmain. Later, they played their home games at Rockdale Ilinden Sports Centre, but continued to train at Birchgrove Oval. They have previously played at Wentworth Park and Lambert Park, and occasionally played home games at Leichhardt Oval and Fraser Park. After several years of playing in the NSW State League Division 2, they gained promotion at the end of the 2008 season to Division 1 after a hard-fought match against Camden, winning on penalties. In 2012 they made the finals series in Division 1 for the first time in the club's history and followed this up by winning the 2013 grand final and securing the State League 1 title. Balmain were the first club to qualify for the Round of 32 of the 2015 FFA Cup. They formerly played in the NSW State League, after being relegated from NSW Premier League 3. The Youth teams (U13-16) play in NSW NPL 2 Youth.

History
In 1986 Roy Lawrence, an English migrant living in Sydney and Steve Hendrick formed a six-a-side football competition, inviting all Brits living in Australia to play in the competition. Following significant interest from dozens of players, Lawrence and Hendrick formed Balmain Tigers Soccer Club and entered it into the Canterbury District Premier League. The first season in the CDSFA was a huge success, finishing runners up and reaching the grand final. This early success saw the club promoted to the NSW Soccer Federation Division Seven in 1989. The next season, they continued their successful run, finishing runners-up and grand finalists. Ultimately they were promoted and continued to be promoted yearly all the way up into Division Six. In 1991, the club won Division Six, losing only two games.

In 1992 the club moved from Easton Park (Rozelle) to Lambert Park (Leichhardt) where the club promoted in Division Four.

In 1995 Lawrence retired as coach, manager and secretary. The following year, the club moved to Birchgrove Oval and reformed under new coach Bruce Allen.

In 1997 Lawrence came out of retirement and took up role of assistant coach to Bruce Allen. In 1998, ten years after the club was founded, two new coaches were appointed. Tony Dunn from Concord SC, and former Balmain SC player Jimmy Campbell, with the latter taking Balmain into Division Three, after winning the 1999 Grand Final.

The 2000 season saw Balmain finish runners up in Division Three and gained promotion to Division Two. 
Their remarkable rise from Division Seven culminated in 2001 with an astonishing Grand Final win on penalties after finishing runners up in the minor premiership.

In 2002 the club was invited into Division One but with mounting debts, the club found itself in dire financial straits. It was forced to sell its position to The Northern Tigers and drop down to Division Four. President Dave Grill vowed that if the club was ever presented with this opportunity again they would be ready.

A year later, the returning Jimmy Campbell led Balmain Tigers FC to second place in Division Four and promotion back to Division Three. In 2004 Balmain claimed the Minor premierships in both grades and two grand final appearances, with the reserves taking out the double and the firsts losing out on penalties. With three out of four titles secured, this was Balmain's most successful season to date.

Jimmy Campbell left the club in 2005 and the following two seasons saw a mid-table finish and a disappointing exit in the semi-finals. The Under-21s, coached by Alex Kaltenegger and his exciting brand of football, won their championship in 2006.

In 2007, Kalteneffer was promoted to the first team, his first point of business was to stun the footballing world with the signing (on a free) of Johnny Buonavoglia the ex-NSL and Sydney FC forward and by 2008 they had won the Division title and beat Camden in the Grand Final on Penalties. True to his word Dave Grill along with his committee saw that the club was ready to be promoted to Division One, where it rightfully took its place in 2009.

After a number of mid-table finishes in Division One, the 2012 squad secured 5th spot in the league, enabling Balmain to participate in the Division One final's series for the first time, where they progressed to the qualifying final.

The end of 2012 season heralded a significant shift behind the scenes with under-20s' coach Joe Di Giulio being promoted to first grade manager and Alex Kaltenegger, arguably Balmain's most successful coach, stepping down after six years in charge. Johnny Buonavoglia also left the club along with a number of first-grade players meaning Balmain would head into the 2013 season with a new look playing group and a new home in the form of Wentworth Park.

The 2013 season turned out to be the most successful in terms of highest achievement in the club's history as the new look Tigers narrowly missed out on the minor premiership, finishing third, but won their way through to the Grand Final, hosted at Jensen Oval, where they defeated Northbridge FC 2–0 after extra time to secure the NSW State League One Title. This milestone meant that from Division Five, every division the club has played in, they have either won the minor premiership, championship or both.

Balmain FC created FFA Cup history, in only the competitions second year, when they qualified for the 2015 FFA Cup Round of 32 to play the A-League club Melbourne Victory. In qualifying for the national knockout stage, they beat non-league clubs Glenmore Park FC (5–0), and North Epping Rangers FC (5–0). Balmain would also defeat National Premier Leagues NSW 2 club Bankstown City (3–1), before defeating Western NSW Mariners FC 0–3.

Club colours
Sporting teams representing Balmain District traditionally take the colours of black and gold. These colours were first adopted by the Balmain Rowing Club on its formation in 1882, and soon became recognised as the district colours. Almost every sporting team that represents Balmain is called the Tigers, which originated with the Balmain District Rugby League Football club in 1908. Most Balmain Junior Football Club teams are black and gold. In 2005, Balmain FC changed from gold to yellow, but are still nicknamed the Tigers. In 2017, club president Terry Wilkinson signed a three-year deal with Italian sports brand Givova to become the new club kit sponsor.

Current Playing Squad
1st Grade squad as of Jan 2015

Season by season record

Current Senior Coach Staff
Senior Coaching Staff as of Aug 2017

Management
First Grade: Sash Tirovski
Under 20s: Greg Ahladiotis
Under 18's: Ewen Page

References

External links
 

Association football clubs established in 1987
Soccer clubs in Sydney
1987 establishments in Australia
Balmain, New South Wales